The team dressage event was one of six equestrian events on the Equestrian at the 1992 Summer Olympics programme. The competition was held at the Royal Polo Club in Barcelona.

The competition consisted of one phase:

Grand Prix (2–3 August)
All team members performed the Grand Prix test. The three highest scores of each team were summed to determine the placings.

Results

References
1992 Summer Olympics official report Volume 5, Part 1 p. 170. 
Sports-reference.com 1992 Team dressage results

Team dressage